Bikers Against Child Abuse (B.A.C.A. or B.A.C.A. International, Inc.) is a charitable worldwide motorcycle club. Based in Provo, Utah since its inception in 1995 by BYU graduate, psychologist, play therapist and social worker John Paul Lilly, their organization "exists with the intent to create a safer environment for abused children".

B.A.C.A. was founded in 1995 in Provo, Utah. The organization's mission is to empower abused children to not be afraid of the world in which they live by working in conjunction with local and state officials who are already in place to protect children. To accomplish its goal, B.A.C.A. uses the stigma surrounding bikers as strong, mean and menacing to its advantage, their presence warding off potential threats in an effort to protect children in need. B.A.C.A. maintains groups of members, known as Chapters, in eighteen countries: United States, Australia, Belgium, Canada, Denmark, Germany, Spain, France, Greece, Iceland, Italy, Netherlands, New Zealand, Austria, Portugal, Switzerland, Sweden, and the United Kingdom.

Activities 
Any legal guardian who feels their child may have been abused or may potentially be "frightened by his or her environment" can officially request that B.A.C.A. open a case for their child. The organization immediately confirms that local authorities have been contacted and that the abuse has been reported, before meeting with the family in order to determine whether making direct contact with the child would be in their best interest, and whether the situation adheres to the B.A.C.A. Mission; one main factor of discretion being that B.A.C.A. does not involve themselves in domestic issues. 

If the case is valid according to the B.A.C.A. Mission, the organization offers for the child to join as a "Level 1 Intervention". Upon accepting a case, two bikers — generally, one male and one female — act as primary contacts with B.A.C.A. for the child and their family and as a general positive presence. The two bikers may then perform follow-up visits with the family periodically and notify the organization of any specific needs the child might have. 

If "Level 1" intervention is not sufficient to deter further abuse or harassment, members may establish a temporary presence at the home of the child as a "Level 2" intervention, being visible at times the family might be the most vulnerable to deter further abuse and, if necessary, protect the children and the family from any violence.

Any cases referred from other established agencies are subject to review by local legal and child services systems before B.A.C.A. responds with any type of contact.B.A.C.A. is able to receive referrals from Child Protective Services, therapists, clergy, and other organizations if they know of a child who could use B.A.C.A.’s support.

Members may attend court proceedings with the children if the court permits, in an effort to assist the child in being less intimidated and frightened, and subsequently giving a more accurate testimony. B.A.C.A. may also escort them with errands or to school if they are in fear. According to the organization, members can help the child's legal guardians to navigate the child-welfare system and understand how to file different legal documents such as restraining orders and guardianship documents.

In addition to private events, each chapter of the organization worldwide holds mandatory meetings, which are open to the public, and an annual hundred-mile ride to raise awareness. They may also host awareness and fundraising events like poker runs, particularly during April for Child Abuse Awareness Month.  Some chapters hold balloon release events to commemorate abused and/or deceased children.

Jan Broberg appearance 
Actress Jan Broberg Felt, who had previously been kidnapped twice by Robert Ersol Berchtold, was with her mother at the Dixie State College in St. George, Utah for the annual Women's Conference. Fifteen B.A.C.A. members offered to escort Broberg and provide their services as security personnel after Berchtold threatened violence against her if she presented her book, “Stolen Innocence: The Jan Broberg Story” at the Conference.

The Conference commenced without issue until Berchtold arrived at the event. He approached B.A.C.A. member Les Watson and asked him to hand out literature to attendees. Watson wanted to review the papers before passing them out, which caused Berchtold to threaten him. Watson refused to hand out the papers, at which point he told other B.A.C.A. members to call the police. Berchtold returned to his vehicle before revving his engine aggressively and subsequently striking Watson with his vehicle. Upon being struck, Watson continued to cling to the van's hood for about 100 feet, at which point Berchtold brandished a gun and Watson jumped from the moving vehicle. Watson subsequently suffered back and leg injuries from the incident.

A witness was later able to provide the van's license plate number, which led to Berchtold's arrest on charges of simple assault, criminal trespassing and disorderly conduct. He was held at the Purgatory Correctional Facility in Hurricane, Utah until he was released on $970 bail, which was later increased to $19,250 after he was charged.

Program evaluation 
One of the group's founders, J.P. "Chief" Lilly, and at least one other confirmed member of the group, Dee C. Ray, conducted a self-published study. Lilly states the organization has respect and support in their mission from the four largest motorcycle clubs in the United States: the Bandidos, the Hells Angels, the Pagans and the Outlaws.  Staten Island Chapter President at the time, "Popeye", made references to the study in 2016, well before its publication, calling it "a preliminary study from 2014".

The B.A.C.A. study states, “Although we are cautious in interpreting causation due to nature of single group design, it is evident that child emotional and behavioral improvement occurred during the time that children were involved in B.A.C.A. intervention.  However, it should be noted, improvement also correlated with children’s temporal distance from the crisis situation.”

Complaints 
On April 10, 2004, several members of B.A.C.A. arrived at a victim’s home upon the request of the child's mother. The child's alleged teenage abuser lived next door, and it was stated by the perpetrator's lawyer that B.A.C.A. members revved their engines and pointed at the alleged perpetrator's house. The article states most of the B.A.C.A. members did not know the alleged perpetrator lived next door, and therefore were not acting in a deliberate way as to harass the perpetrator. The police were called and approximately 20 officers visited the house. This incident escalated with allegations that the Payson police would start following the victim's family and any B.A.C.A. members any time they would be seen driving around town.

In a June 2004 article, a former member alleged that some B.A.C.A. members had a tendency to take the law into their own hands. 

In 2016, New Zealand Police voiced concerns when B.A.C.A. opened their Auckland Chapter. At the time, Auckland B.A.C.A. Secretary Anne Murphy stated, "We do not use violence or intimidation.”

Membership 

Road names are used by members and for any children in the abused family for confidentiality and protection. Each member undergoes a minimum of 40–50 hours of initial training to better help support victims. Before becoming a supporter, a person must be at least 18 years of age, be fingerprinted and have an extensive FBI background check done to ensure there are no prior charges of child or domestic abuse.

Structure 

B.A.C.A. is a U.S. Registered non-profit, 501(c)(3) tax exempt organization as designated by the Internal Revenue Service.

Disgraced former members 
On March 18, 2009, the Cyber Crime Unit of the Texas Attorney General's office announced that David Wayne Garvey, a member of B.A.C.A. in Houston, had been arrested for possession of child pornography. Upon being notified of his arrest, the Houston chapter permanently revoked Garvey's membership. Garvey was sentenced on March 29, 2011, to 20 years on four counts of “Possession with intent to promote child pornography”, Texas Penal Code 43.26(e).

Two members of the Sam Bass chapter of B.A.C.A. in Round Rock, Texas, Daniel Rodriguez and his wife Shirley Ann Rodriguez, were arrested on July 18, 2018, for 23 counts of abusing foster children in their care, including indecency with a child and injury to a child. The Sam Bass chapter permanently revoked the memberships for both Daniel and Shirley Ann Rodriguez upon learning of the arrests.

Oklahoma B.A.C.A. member Richard David West, 41, was arrested July 10, 2019 and charged with Lewd or Indecent Acts or Proposals to a Child Under 16. West was found to have photos and videos of the 15 year old victim who was introduced to him when she was 12 years old through the B.A.C.A. referral.

Similar organizations

See also 
 Child protection
 List of outlaw motorcycle clubs
 Outlaw motorcycle club

References

External links

Video Introduction
Professor Leads B.A.C.A. Crusade
Bikers Guard a Girl's House Night and Day
How Do Bikers Unite Against Child Abuse and Empower Children? - Badd Bob - TEDxCincinnati

Child abuse-related organizations
Charities based in Utah
1995 establishments in Utah
Motorcycle clubs in the United States